Senator Dodge may refer to:

Members of the United States Senate
Augustus C. Dodge (1812–1883), U.S. Senator from Iowa from 1848 to 1855
Henry Dodge (1782–1867), U.S. Senator from Wisconsin from 1848 to 1857

United States state senate members
William C. Dodge (1880–1973), New York State Senate
William I. Dodge (1780s–1873), New York State Senate